A fire motorcycle is a motorcycle used by a fire department.  Several countries around the world use fire vehicles based on a motorcycle, often for rapid intervention to beat traffic congestion, and the equipment carried ranges from simple extinguishers to jet guns with hose rigs.  Firefighters may also use fire motorcycles to offer medical first aid treatment.  In the United Kingdom, fire motorcycles are used by some fire services for road safety awareness campaigns.

Worldwide users

Fire motorcycles are used around the world.

Australia
The New South Wales Rural Fire Service (NSW RFS) uses motorcycles during wildfire operations to conduct rapid response to lightning strikes for dry fire fighting, Remote Area Firefighting Team (RAFT) operations, fire trail inspections, assessment of forward containment lines, and to act as a visual deterrent in areas of suspected serial arson in bush land.  In addition to firefighting, these motorcycles are employed to assist the State Emergency Service and New South Wales Police Force in search and rescue operations throughout the state.  They are commonly equipped with basic first aid kits, chainsaws, and extinguishers.

Brazil
The São Paulo Fire Department of Brazil use teams of two fire motorcycles to reduce first response times to fire or medical emergencies in the congested streets of São Paulo from 10–15 minutes to just five minutes.  Their motorcycles are  machines, and carry basic emergency medical services (EMS) equipment, tools, signalling devices, and other accessories, such as hand lights and elevator keys.

China
Beijing introduced fire motorcycle operations for Asia-Pacific Economic Cooperation (APEC) summit in 2014.

Hong Kong
Fire motorcycles are used in Hong Kong.  According to the Hong Kong Fire Services Department's website,  "Fire Motorcycles (F.M.C.) are special fire appliances developed by Firexpress A/S in Denmark to provide rapid response and to carry out fire fighting operation".  They are using BMW R1100RT as their fire motorcycles.

Brunei
Fire motorcycles are used in Brunei Darussalam by their Fire and Rescue Department.

Denmark
Fire motorcycles have been used in Denmark.

Germany
Some municipal fire departments in Germany use motorcycles for reconnaissance, courier duties, and traffic control.  However, motorbikes are not part of the national Deutsches Institut für Normung (DIN) standards for fire apparatus; if their purchase by a municipal department will be subsidised with state funds depends on local laws.

Iran
Iran National Fire Department uses two models of Honda motorcycle in Tehran, and some models of Hyosung motorcycles in other metropolises of Iran.

Italy
Fire motorcycles are used in Italy.

Japan
In Japan, the Tokyo Fire Department uses pairs of motorcycle units nicknamed 'Quick Attackers' for fire-fighting, rescue, and medical first aid treatment.  The units comprise two  bikes operating - a 'type T' unit is equipped with a portable impulse fire extinguishing system, while a 'type U' unit carries simple rescue equipment and fire extinguishers.  As of 2001, 20 Quick Attacker teams were in service.  With Japan having a long history of earthquakes, Quick Attacker units are capable of off-road response, and are also used for rapid fact-finding in earthquake and other disaster zones.

Kazakhstan
First 'Jawa' fire motorcycles in Almaty were presented in November 2016.

Malaysia
The Royal Malaysian Fire and Rescue Department and the Royal Malaysian Civil Defence Force in order to combat increasing traffic congestion which delays ordinary fire appliances, with response time being a critical factor in preventing the spread of fires in the high-rise residential blocks.  The force operates three-man fire motorcycle teams manned by junior officers.  They are usually the first to arrive at the scene of a fire or an incident, and if necessary, will enter a premises to fight or prevent the spread of a fire.  The riders are equipped with impulse guns, which can fire powerful bursts of water mist at speeds of up to 200 metres per second.

Nepal
Fire motorcycles have been proposed for use in Kathmandu, the capital city of Nepal.

Singapore
The Singapore Civil Defence Force introduced fire motorcycles in 1998, in order to combat increasing traffic congestion which delays conventional fire appliances, with response time being a critical factor in preventing the spread of fires in the high-rise residential blocks of the urban island state.  The force operates two-man fire motorcycle teams manned by junior officers.  They are usually the first to arrive at the scene of a fire, and if necessary, will enter a premises to fight or prevent the spread of a fire.  The riders are equipped with impulse guns, which can fire powerful bursts of water mist at speeds of up to 200 metres per second.  The motorcycle model used in the force is the Honda CB400 Spec 3.

Sweden
Fire motorcycles were previously used in Sweden, but they are no longer in current use.

Turkey
Fire motorcycles are used in Turkey.

Taiwan
Fire motorcycles are used for tunnel fires in Taiwan.

United Kingdom

In the United Kingdom, the Merseyside Fire and Rescue Service has operated a number of fire motorcycles in different roles since 2005. In July 2010, they became the first fire service in the UK to deploy fire motorcycles specially equipped to fight fires. They are to be used to combat small fires, and to free up main fire appliances. They were to undergo a six-month trial, with the prospect of being adopted by other forces if found to be effective. Since 2005, Merseyside had been using a fire motorcycle to attend automated fire alarm calls in Liverpool to assess situations ahead of the arrival of main appliances, due to rising traffic congestion, and because most of these automated calls are false alarms. In 2007, Merseyside also introduced two Honda quad-bikes for fire safety awareness campaigns, and possibly for operational use to fight woodland or grass fires.

A number of UK fire services also operate fire motorcycles; not to fight fires or aid fire response times, but instead to promote safe motorcycle riding.  Bikes are operated in this role by the fire services of East Sussex, West Sussex, North Wales, Kent, and Northumberland.  The Northumberland fire motorcycle was later fitted with an external automatic defibrillator and trauma care kit allowing it to also be used as a response vehicle for road traffic accidents.

United States
Fire motorcycles are very uncommon in the United States of America.  In September 2012, the Los Angeles City Fire Department started a trial run studying the use of a motorcycle response team for brush fires, and to aid during times of heavy congestion.

See also

Firefighting worldwide
Motorcycle ambulance
Police motorcycle

References

External links

https://web.archive.org/web/20161109022901/https://motor.kz/post/blizhe-k-zime-pozharnye-poluchili-motochikly-36428/

Motorcycle
Utility motorcycles